Dr. Carlos José Argüello Gómez is a Nicaraguan lawyer and diplomat. He has been the Nicaraguan Ambassador to the Netherlands since 1983.

Early life and education 

Carlos José Argüello Gómez was born in San José, Costa Rica, on 27 July 1946,  the son of Nicaraguan nationals Fernando Argüello Solórzano and Alina Gómez Argüello.  He studied Legal Sciences at  Universidad Centroamericana (UCA) and received his A.B. in 1976. From 1980 until 1982, he served as Deputy Minister of Justice, and from 1982 until 1983, he served as Nicaragua's Minister of Justice.

References

1946 births
Living people
20th-century Nicaraguan lawyers
Ambassadors of Nicaragua to the United Kingdom
Ambassadors of Nicaragua to the Netherlands